Munehisa is a masculine Japanese given name. Notable people with the name include:

, Japanese stock trader
, Japanese speed skater
, Japanese director

Japanese masculine given names